The geography of Antarctica is dominated by its south polar location and, thus, by ice. The Antarctic continent, located in the Earth's southern hemisphere, is centered asymmetrically around the South Pole and largely south of the Antarctic Circle. It is washed by the Southern (or Antarctic) Ocean or, depending on definition, the southern Pacific, Atlantic, and Indian Oceans. It has an area of more than 14 million km2. Antarctica is the largest ice desert in the world.

Some 98% of Antarctica is covered by the Antarctic ice sheet, the world's largest ice sheet and also its largest reservoir of fresh water. Averaging at least 1.6 km thick, the ice is so massive that it has depressed the continental bedrock in some areas more than 2.5 km below sea level; subglacial lakes of liquid water also occur (e.g., Lake Vostok). Ice shelves and rises populate the ice sheet on the periphery. The present Antarctic ice sheet accounts for 90 percent of Earth's total ice volume and 70 percent of its fresh water. It houses enough water to raise global sea level by 200 ft.

In September 2018, researchers at the National Geospatial-Intelligence Agency released a high resolution terrain map (detail down to the size of a car, and less in some areas) of Antarctica, named the "Reference Elevation Model of Antarctica" (REMA).

Regions

Physically, Antarctica is divided in two by the Transantarctic Mountains, close to the neck between the Ross Sea and the Weddell Sea. Western Antarctica and Eastern Antarctica correspond roughly to the western and eastern hemispheres relative to the Greenwich meridian.

West Antarctica is covered by the West Antarctic Ice Sheet. There has been some concern about this ice sheet, because there is a small chance that it will collapse. If it does, ocean levels would rise by a few metres in a very short period of time.

Volcanoes
Volcanoes that occur underneath glacial ice sheets are known by the term "Glaciovolcanism", or subglacial volcanoes.  An article published in 2017 claims that researchers from Edinburgh University recently discovered 91 new volcanoes below the Antarctic ice sheet, adding to the 47 volcanoes that were already known. As of today, there have been 138 possible volcanoes identified in West Antarctica. There is limited knowledge about West Antarctic Volcanoes due to the presence of the West Antarctic Ice Sheet, which heavily covers the West Antarctic Rift System—a likely hub for volcanic activity.  Researchers find it difficult to properly identify volcanic activity due to the comprehensive ice covering.

East Antarctica is significantly larger than West Antarctica, and similarly remains widely unexplored in terms of its volcanic potential. While there are some indications that there is volcanic activity under the East Antarctic Ice Sheet, there is not a significant amount of present information on the subject.

Mount Erebus is one of the most notable sites in the study of Antarctic Volcanism, in that it is the southernmost historically active volcanic site on the planet.

Deception Island is another active Antarctic volcano. It is one of the most protected areas in the Antarctic, given its situation between the South Shetland Islands and the Antarctic Peninsula. As the most active volcano in the Antarctic peninsula, it has been studied closely since its initial discovery in 1820.

There are four volcanoes on the mainland of Antarctica that are
considered to be active on the basis of observed fumarolic activity or 
"recent" tephra deposits: 
Mount Melbourne (2,730 m) (74°21'S., 164°42'E.), a stratovolcano; 
Mount Berlin (3,500 m) (76°03'S., 135°52'W.), a stratovolcano; 
Mount Kauffman (2,365 m) (75°37'S., 132°25'W.), a stratovolcano; and 
Mount Hampton (3,325 m) (76°29'S., 125°48'W.), a volcanic caldera.
Mount Rittmann (2,600 m) (73.45°S 165.5° E), a volcanic caldera.
 
Several volcanoes on offshore islands have records of historic activity.
Mount Erebus (3,795 m), a stratovolcano on
Ross Island with 10 known eruptions and 1 suspected eruption.
On the opposite side of the continent, 
Deception Island
(62°57'S., 60°38'W.), a volcanic caldera with 10 known
and 4 suspected eruptions, have been the most active.
Buckle Island in the Balleny Islands (66°50'S., 163°12'E.), 
Penguin Island (62°06'S., 57°54'W.), 
Paulet Island (63°35'S., 55°47'W.), and 
Lindenberg Island (64°55'S., 59°40'W.) are also 
considered to be active. In 2017, the researchers of Edinburgh University discovered 91 underwater volcanoes under West Antarctica.

Glaciovolcanism 
The definition of Glaciovolcanism is “the interactions of magma with ice in all its forms, including snow, firn and any meltwater.” It defines a special field of volcanic that is specifically centered around ice and ice melt. This field of science is less than 100 years old, and thus continuously makes new discoveries. Glaciovolcanism is characterized by three kinds of eruptions: sub-glacial eruptions, supraglacial volcanism, and ice-marginal volcanism.

The study of glaciovolcanism is vital to the understanding of ice sheet formation. It is also a valuable tool to predict volcanic hazards, such as the ash hazard following the Eyjafjallajökull eruption in Iceland.

Marie Byrd Land 
The Marie Byrd Land is an incredibly large portion of West Antarctica, consisting of the Area below the Antarctic Peninsula. The Marie Byrd land is a large formation of volcanic rock, characterized by 18 exposed and subglacial volcanoes. 16 of the 18 volcanoes are entirely covered by the antarctic ice sheet. There have been no eruptions recorded from any of the volcanoes in this area, however scientists believe that some of the volcanoes may be potentially active.

Activity 
Scientists and researchers debate whether or not the 138 identified possible volcanoes are active or dormant. It is very hard to definitively say, given that many of these volcanic structures are buried underneath several kilometers of ice. However, ash layers within the West Antarctic Ice Sheet, as well as deformations in the ice surface indicate that the West Antarctic Rift System could be active and contain erupting volcanoes. Additionally, seismic activity in the region hints at magma movement beneath the crust, a sign of volcanic activity. Despite this, however, there is not yet definitive evidence of presently active volcanoes.

Subglacial volcanism is often characterized by ice melt and subglacial water. Though there are other sources of subglacial water, such as geothermal heat, it almost always is a condition of volcanism. Scientists remain uncertain about the presence of water underneath the West Antarctic Ice Sheet, with some claiming to have found evidence indicating the existence.

Conditions of Formation 
In West Antarctica's Marie Byrd Land, volcanoes are typically composed of alkaline and basaltic lava. Sometimes, the volcanoes are entirely basaltic in composition. Due to the geographic similarity of the Marie Byrd Land, it is believed that the volcanoes in the West Antarctic Rift System are also composed of basalt.

Above-ice basaltic volcanoes, also known as subaerial basaltic volcanoes, generally form in tall, broad cone shapes. Since they are formed from repeated piling of liquid magma sourced from the center, they spread widely and grow upwards relatively slowly. However, West Antarctic Volcanoes form underneath ice sheets, and are thus categorized as subglacial volcanoes. Subglacial volcanoes that are monogenetic are far more narrow, steeper, flat topped structures. Polygenetic subglacial volcanoes have a wider variety of shapes and sizes due to being made up of many different eruptions. Often, they look more cone shaped, like stratovolcanoes.

Hazards

Hazardous ash 
Little has been studied about the implications of volcanic ash from eruptions within the Antarctic Circle. It is likely that an eruption at lower latitudes would cause global health and aviation hazards due to ash disbursement. The clockwise air circulation around the low pressure system at the South Pole forces air upwards, hypothetically sending ash upwards towards the Stratospheric jet streams, and thus quickly dispersing it throughout the globe.

Melting ice 
Recently, in 2017, a study found evidence of subglacial volcanic activity within the West Antarctic Ice Sheet. This activity poses a threat to the stability of the Ice Sheet, as volcanic activity leads to increased melting. This could possibly plunge the West Antarctic Ice Sheet into a positive feedback loop of rising temperatures and increased melting.

Canyons 
There are three vast canyons that run for hundreds of kilometers, cutting through tall mountains. None of the canyons are visible at the snow-covered surface of the continent since they are buried under hundreds of meters of ice. The largest of the canyons is called Foundation Trough and is over 350 km long and 35 km wide. The Patuxent Trough is more than 300 km long and over 15 km wide, while the Offset Rift Basin is 150 km long and 30 km wide. These three troughs all lie under and cross the so-called "ice divide" - the high ice ridge that runs all the way from the South Pole out towards the coast of West Antarctica.

West Antarctica

West Antarctica is the smaller part of the continent, (50° – 180°W), divided into:

Areas
 Antarctic Peninsula (55° – 75°W)
 Graham Land
 Palmer Land
 Queen Elizabeth Land (20°W – 80°W)
 Ellsworth Land (79°45' – 103°24'W)
 English Coast
 Bryan Coast
 Eights Coast
 Marie Byrd Land (103°24' – 158°W)
 Walgreen Coast
 Bakutis Coast
 Hobbs Coast
 Ruppert Coast
 Saunders Coast
 King Edward VII Land (166°E – 155°W)
 Shirase Coast

Seas
 Scotia Sea (26°30' – 65°W)
 Weddell Sea (57°18' – 102°20'W)
 Bellingshausen Sea (57°18' – 102°20'W)
 Amundsen Sea (102°20′ – 126°W)

Ice shelves
Larger ice shelves are:
 Filchner-Ronne Ice Shelf (30° – 83°W)
 Larsen Ice Shelf
 Abbot Ice Shelf (89°35' – 103°W)
 Getz Ice Shelf (114°30' – 136°W)
 Sulzberger Ice Shelf
 Ross Ice Shelf (166°E – 155°W)
For all ice shelves see List of Antarctic ice shelves.

Islands
For a list of all Antarctic islands see List of Antarctic and sub-Antarctic islands.

East Antarctica

East Antarctica is the larger part of the continent, (50°W – 180°E), both the South Magnetic Pole and geographic South Pole are situated here. Divided into:

Areas
 Coats Land (20° – 36°W)
 Queen Maud Land (20°W – 45°E)
 Princess Martha Coast
 Princess Astrid Coast
 Princess Ragnhild Coast
 Prince Harald Coast
 Prince Olav Coast
 Enderby Land (44°38' – 56°25'E)
 Kemp Land (56°25' – 59°34'E)
 Mac. Robertson Land (59°34' – 73°E)
 Princess Elizabeth Land (73° – 87°43'E)
 Wilhelm II Land (87°43' – 91°54'E)
 Queen Mary Land (91°54' – 100°30'E)
 Wilkes Land (100°31' – 136°11'E)
 Adélie Land (136°11′ – 142°02′E)
 George V Land (142°02' – 153°45'E)
George V Coast
Zélée Subglacial Trench
 Oates Land (153°45' – 160°E)
 Victoria Land (70°30' – 78°'S)

Seas
 Weddell Sea (57°18' – 102°20'W)
 King Haakon VII Sea (20°W – 45°E)
 Davis Sea (82° – 96°E)
 Mawson Sea (95°45' – 113°E)
 D'Urville Sea (140°E)
 Ross Sea (166°E – 155°W)
 Bellingshausen Sea (57°18' – 102°20'W)
 Scotia Sea (26°30' – 65°W)

Ice shelves
Larger ice shelves are:
 Riiser-Larsen Ice Shelf
 Ekstrom Ice Shelf
 Amery Ice Shelf
 West Ice Shelf
 Shackleton Ice Shelf
 Voyeykov Ice Shelf
For all ice shelves see List of Antarctic ice shelves.

Islands
For a list of all Antarctic islands see List of Antarctic and sub-Antarctic islands.

Research stations

Territorial landclaims
Seven nations have made official Territorial claims in Antarctica.

Dependences and territories
Bouvet Island
French Southern and Antarctic Lands
Heard and McDonald Islands
South Georgia and the South Sandwich Islands
Peter I Island

See also
 List of Antarctic and Subantarctic islands
 Geology of Antarctica

Notes

References

General references
 Ivanov, L. General Geography and History of Livingston Island. In: Bulgarian Antarctic Research: A Synthesis. Eds. C. Pimpirev and N. Chipev. Sofia: St. Kliment Ohridski University Press, 2015. pp. 17–28.

External links
 High resolution map (2018) – Reference Elevation Model of Antarctica (REMA)
 Political Claims Map
 USGS TerraWeb: Satellite Image Map of Antarctica (archived 1March 2005)
 United States Antarctic Resource Center (USARC)
 BEDMAP (archived 25 January 2005)
 Antarctic Digital Database (Topographic data for Antarctica, including web map browser)
 Landsat Image Mosaic of Antarctica (LIMA; USGS web pages)
 Landsat Image Mosaic of Antarctica (LIMA; NASA web pages) (archived 14 February 2015)
 Geography of the land under the ice of Antarctica:
http://www.cbc.ca/news/technology/nasa-map-shows-what-antarctica-would-look-like-without-ice-1.1304997
https://www.bas.ac.uk/project/bedmap-2/
https://www.bas.ac.uk/data/our-data/maps/thematic-maps/bedmap2/
https://www.the-cryosphere.net/7/375/2013/tc-7-375-2013.pdf article in The Cryosphere, 7, 375–393, 2013
https://www.google.com/search?q=bedmap2&ie=utf-8&oe=utf-8&client=firefox-b Google search